Nakoma may refer to:

 Nakoma (Pocahontas character), a character in the Pocahontas Disney film in 1995
 Novell "Nakoma", a codename for Novell NetWare 6.5
 Lake Nakoma, in Nebraska and Iowa, U.S.
 Nakoma Products, a cleaning products company; see Endust and Behold

See also